Athletes from the Netherlands competed at the 1976 Winter Olympics in Innsbruck, Austria.

Medalists

Figure skating

Speed skating

Men

Women

References
Official Olympic Reports
International Olympic Committee results database
Olympic Winter Games 1976, full results by sports-reference.com

Nations at the 1976 Winter Olympics
1976
W